The 1954 Australian Championships was a tennis tournament that took place on outdoor grass courts at the White City Tennis Club, Sydney, Australia from 22 January to 1 February. It was the 42nd edition of the Australian Championships (now known as the Australian Open), the 12th held in Sydney, and the first Grand Slam tournament of the year. The singles titles were won by Australians Mervyn Rose and Thelma Coyne Long.

Finals

Men's singles

 Mervyn Rose defeated  Rex Hartwig  6–2, 0–6, 6–4, 6–2

Women's singles

 Thelma Coyne Long defeated  Jenny Staley  6–3, 6–4

Men's doubles
 Rex Hartwig /  Mervyn Rose defeated  Neale Fraser /  Clive Wilderspin 6–3, 6–4, 6–2

Women's doubles
 Mary Bevis Hawton /  Beryl Penrose defeated  Hazel Redick-Smith /  Julia Wipplinger 6–3, 8–6

Mixed doubles
 Thelma Coyne Long /  Rex Hartwig defeated  Beryl Penrose /  John Bromwich 4–6, 6–1, 6–2

Boys' singles
 Billy Knight defeated  Roy Emerson 6–3, 6–1

References

External links
 Australian Open official website

1954
1954 in Australian tennis
January 1954 sports events in Australia
February 1954 sports events in Australia